Syndesis may refer to:

Arthrodesis, in orthopedic surgery
Synapsis, in cell biology